This is a list of schools in Shunyi District, Beijing.

Secondary schools
Note: In China the word 中学 zhōngxué, literally translated as "middle school", refers to any secondary school and differs from the American usage of the term "middle school" to mean specifically a lower secondary school or junior high school. 初中 chū​zhōng is used to refer to a lower secondary school.

 Beijing No. 4 High School Shunyi Branch School (Beijing City Shunyi District No. 10 High School) (北京市第四中学顺义分校（北京市顺义区第十中学） )
 Beijing City Dingshi School (北京市鼎石学校)
 Beijing City Hai Jia Bilingual School (北京市海嘉双语学校)
 Beijing City Niulanshan No. 1 High School Experimental School (北京市牛栏山一中实验学校)
 Beijing City Xin Fu Xue Foreign Languages School (北京市新府学外国语学校)
 Beijing City Xin Ying Cai School (北京市新英才学校)
 Beijing City Shunyi District No. 4 School (北京市顺义区第四学校)
 Beijing City Shunyi District Gao Li Ying School (北京市顺义区高丽营学校)
 Beijing City Shunyi District Hai De Jing Hua Bilingual School (北京市顺义区海德京华双语学校)
 Beijing City Shunyi District Qingmiao School (北京市顺义区青苗学校)
 Beijing City Shunyi District No. 1 High School (北京市顺义区第一中学)
 Beijing City Shunyi District No. 2 High School (北京市顺义区第二中学)
 Beijing City Shunyi District No. 3 High School (北京市顺义区第三中学)
 Beijing City Shunyi District No. 5 High School (北京市顺义区第五中学)
 Beijing City Shunyi District No. 8 High School (北京市顺义区第八中学)
 Beijing City Shunyi District No. 9 High School (北京市顺义区第九中学)
 Beijing City Shunyi District No. 11 High School (北京市顺义区第十一中学)
 Beijing City Shunyi District No. 12 High School (北京市顺义区第十二中学)
 Beijing City Shunyi District No. 13 High School (北京市顺义区第十三中学)
 Beijing City Shunyi District No. 15 High School (北京市顺义区第十五中学)
 Beijing City Shunyi District Beiwu High School (北京市顺义区北务中学)
 Beijing City Shunyi District Li Qiao High School (北京市顺义区李桥中学)
 Beijing City Shunyi District Li Sui High School (北京市顺义区李遂中学)
 Beijing City Shunyi District Nan Fa Xin High School (北京市顺义区南法信中学)
 Beijing City Shunyi District Niu Lan Shan No. 1 High School (北京市顺义牛栏山第一中学)
 Beijing City Shunyi District Niu Shan No. 2 High School (北京市顺义区牛山第二中学)
 Beijing City Shunyi District Renhe High School  (北京市顺义区仁和中学)
 Beijing City Shunyi District Tianzhu High School (北京市顺义区天竺中学)
 Beijing City Shunyi District Yanhe High School  (北京市顺义区沿河中学)
  (北京市顺义区杨镇第一中学)
 Beijing City Shunyi District Yangzhen No. 2 High School (北京市顺义区杨镇第二中学)
 Beijing City Shunyi District Zhao Quan Ying High School (北京市顺义区赵全营中学)

Primary schools

 Beijing City Ding Shi School (北京市鼎石学校)
 Beijing City Hai Jia Bilingual School (北京市海嘉双语学校)
 Beijing City Niulanshan No. 1 High School Experimental School (北京市牛栏山一中实验学校)
 Beijing City Xin Fu Xue Foreign Language School (北京市新府学外国语学校)
 Beijing City Xin Ying Cai School (北京市新英才学校)
 Beijing City Shunyi District No. 1 High School Affiliated Primary School (北京市顺义区第一中学附属小学)
 Beijing City Shunyi District Banqiao Central Primary School (北京市顺义区板桥中心小学校)
 Beijing City Shunyi District Beixiaoying Central Primary School (北京市顺义区北小营中心小学校)
 Beijing City Shunyi District Beiwu Central Primary School (北京市顺义区北务中心小学校)
 Beijing City Shunyi District Bohua Foreign Language School (北京市顺义区博华外国语学校)
 Beijing City Shunyi District Cangshang Primary School (北京市顺义区仓上小学)
 Beijing City Shunyi District Choujiadian Central Primary School (北京市顺义区仇家店中心小学校)
 Beijing City Shunyi District Dasungezhuang Central Primary School (北京市顺义区大孙各庄中心小学校)
 Beijing City Shunyi District Dongfeng Primary School (北京市顺义区东风小学)
 Beijing City Shunyi District Gangxin Primary School (北京市顺义区港馨小学)
 Beijing City Shunyi District Gao Li Ying School (北京市顺义区高丽营学校)
 Beijing City Shunyi District Gao Li Ying No. 2 Primary School (北京市顺义区高丽营第二小学)
 Beijing City Shunyi District Guangming Primary School (北京市顺义区光明小学)
 Beijing City Shunyi District Hai De Jing Hua Bilingual School (北京市顺义区海德京华双语学校)
 Beijing City Shunyi District Henancun Central Primary School (北京市顺义区河南村中心小学校)
 Beijing City Shunyi District Houshayu Central Primary School (北京市顺义区后沙峪中心小学校)
 Beijing City Shunyi District Jianxin Primary School (北京市顺义区建新小学)
 Beijing City Shunyi District Konggang Primary School (北京市顺义区空港小学)
 Beijing City Shunyi District Konggang No. 2 Primary School (北京市顺义区空港第二小学)
 Beijing City Shunyi District Ligezhuang School (北京市顺义区李各庄学校)
 Beijing City Shunyi District Liqiao Central Primary School (北京市顺义区李桥中心小学校)
 Beijing City Shunyi District Lisui Central Primary School (北京市顺义区李遂中心小学校)
 Beijing City Shunyi District Longwantun Central Primary School  (北京市顺义区龙湾屯中心小学校)
 Beijing City Shunyi District Mapo Central Primary School (北京市顺义区马坡中心小学校)
 Beijing City Shunyi District Mapo No. 2 Primary School (北京市顺义区马坡第二小学)
 Beijing City Shunyi District Mingde Primary School (北京市顺义区明德小学)
 Beijing City Shunyi District Mulin Central Primary School (北京市顺义区木林中心小学校)
 Beijing City Shunyi District Nancai Experimental School (北京市顺义区南彩实验学校)
 Beijing City Shunyi District Nancai No. 1 Primary School (北京市顺义区南彩第一小学)
 Beijing City Shunyi District Nancai No. 2 Primary School (北京市顺义区南彩第二小学)
 Beijing City Shunyi District Nanfaxin Central Primary School (北京市顺义区南法信中心小学校)
 Beijing City Shunyi District Niulanshan No. 1 Primary School (北京市顺义区牛栏山第一小学)
 Beijing City Shunyi District Niulanshan No. 2 Primary School (北京市顺义区牛栏山第二小学)
 Beijing City Shunyi District Niulanshan No. 3 Primary School (北京市顺义区牛栏山第三小学)
 Beijing City Shunyi District Qing Miao School (北京市顺义区青苗学校)
 Beijing City Shunyi District Renhe Central Primary School (北京市顺义区仁和中心小学校)
 Beijing City Shunyi District Shaling School (北京市顺义区沙岭学校)
 Beijing City Shunyi District Shicao Central Primary School (北京市顺义区北石槽中心小学校)
 Beijing City Shunyi District Shiyuan Primary School (北京市顺义区石园小学)
 Beijing City Shunyi District Shuangxing Primary School (北京市顺义区双兴小学)
 Beijing City Shunyi District Tianzhu No. 1 Primary School (北京市顺义区天竺第一小学)
 Beijing City Shunyi District Tianzhu No. 2 Primary School (北京市顺义区天竺第二小学)
 Beijing City Shunyi District Xiaodian Central Primary School (北京市顺义区小店中心小学校)
 Beijing City Shunyi District Xixin Primary School (北京市顺义区西辛小学)
 Beijing City Shunyi District Yanhe Central Primary School (北京市顺义区沿河中心小学校)
 Beijing City Shunyi District Yangzhen Central Primary School (北京市顺义区杨镇中心小学校)
 Beijing City Shunyi District Yudalong Primary School (北京市顺义区裕达隆小学)
 Beijing City Shunyi District Yulong Primary School (北京市顺义区裕龙小学) - New Century Institute School Site (现代学院校址) and Yulong School Site (裕龙校址)
 Beijing City Shunyi District Zhangzhen Central Primary School (北京市顺义区张镇中心小学校)
 Beijing City Shunyi District Zhaoquanying Central Primary School (北京市顺义区赵全营中心小学校)
 Capital Normal University Affiliated Shunyi Experimental School (首都师范大学附属顺义实验小学)

International schools
 International School of Beijing Shunyi Campus
 The British School of Beijing, Shunyi
 Dulwich College Beijing
 International Montessori School of Beijing River Garden Campus and Champagne Cove Campus
 Beijing New Talent Academy
 Beijing International Bilingual Academy
 Springboard International Bilingual School

Closed:
 Swedish School Beijing - Gahood Villa
 Beijing Rego British School

References

 
Shunyi
Schools